National Tea Company Limited is a Bangladeshi state owned tea company based in Dhaka. Sheikh Kabir Hossain, a relative of Prime Minister Sheikh Hasina, is the chairman of the company.  Mr. Syed Shahriyar Ahsan is a Director of the company. Syed is the Managing Director of Sadharan Bima Corporation of Bangladesh (SBC). He was nominated as a Director of the Company from Sadharan Bima Corporation in October 01, 2016. Chowdhury Nafeez Sarafat, chairman of Padma Bank, is a shareholder director of the company representing Finex Software Limited.

History 
National Tea Company Limited was established in 1978 with the government of Bangladesh being the majority shareholder. It is the first tea company in Bangladesh jointly owned by the government and the public. The company started with Patrakhola Tea Estate, Kurmah Tea Estate, Champarai Tea Estate, Madanmohanpur Tea Estate, Madabpur Tea Estate, Jagadishpur Tea Estate, Teliapara Tea Estate, Chundeecherra Tea Estate, and Lackatoorah Tea Estate. The tea estates were taken over by the government after the end of Bangladesh Liberation War and placed under the Bangladesh Tea Industry Management Committee of the Bangladesh Tea Board. Afazuddin Fakir was appointed the first chairman of the company.

The National Tea Company Limited was listed on the Dhaka Stock Exchange in 1979.

In September 1982, the Government of Bangladesh took over Parkul Tea Estate, Premnagar Tea Estate, and Bejoya Tea Estate and placed them under the National Tea Company Limited. The company produces an average of 5.2 million kilograms of tea. The company has more than 12 thousand employees and also produces rubber. Many of the workers are from ethnic minorities in Bangladesh.

In 2009, The Daily Star reported that the National Tea Company Limited saw production decline every year due to corruption and mismanagement. 

On 23 June 2019, Sheikh Kabir Hossain was appointed chairman of the National Tea Company Limited replacing Munshi Shafiul Haque. In the fiscal year 2020, the company saw profits per share decline by 142 percent. In October 2021, Bangladesh Securities and Exchange Commission appointed two independent directors to the company following allegation of violation of security laws.

In February 2022, the National Tea Company Limited sought permission from Bangladesh Securities and Exchange Commission to increase the paid up capital of the company by issuing shares. The commission appointed special auditors to investigate for embezzlement in the company and to protect the interests of the shareholders.

List of chairmen

References 

1978 establishments in Bangladesh
Organisations based in Dhaka
Government-owned companies of Bangladesh